Neooxyartes is a monotypic genus of Asian stick insects in the tribe Necrosciini, erected by G.W.C. Ho in 2018.  To date (2022) the sole species has been recorded from Vietnam.

Species
The Phasmida Species File currently only includes Neooxyartes zomproi Ho, 2018: type locality, Bạch Mã National Park (mountain), Thừa Thiên Huế province.

References

External links

Phasmatodea genera
Phasmatodea of Asia
Lonchodidae